Jenny Haglund (born 26 June 1993) is a Swedish professional golfer who has played on the Ladies European Tour (LET) and the LPGA Tour.

Career
Haglund played college golf at Southern Methodist University before she graduated with a degree in Sports Management and Communications in 2016 and turned professional on June 2nd. She won the 2016 Swedish Golf Tour Order of Merit and finished second in the 2016 LET Access Series Order of Merit rankings, earning promotion to the 2017 Ladies European Tour. 

In 2018, Haglund joined the Symetra Tour, where she found herself in the lead heading into the final round of her first tournament, the IOA Championship. In February 2018, Haglund won a new Hyundai Genesis G80 after a hole-in-one during the third round of the ISPS Handa Women's Australian Open in Adelaide. 

In April 2018, Haglund claimed her first Ladies European Tour title at the 2018 Lalla Meryem Cup in Rabat, Morocco, following a playoff. Having shared a three-way tie for the 72-hole lead with overnight co-leader Sarah Kemp and the 2017 event champion Klára Spilková on three-under-par 285, Haglund took the spoils after blasting a 249-meter drive down the 18th fairway and converting a four-foot putt for birdie. Following the victory, Haglund rose from 276 to 204 in the Women's World Golf Rankings and topped the 2018 Ladies European Tours Order of Merit, five tournaments into the season.

Haglund won the Symetra Classic and received one of the two sponsor invites for the 2018 Women's PGA Championship, but did not make the cut. She finished 12th on the 2018 Symetra Tour official money list, narrowly (by $2,027) missing out on the full exemption to the LPGA Tour awarded the top ten. 

She made 19 starts on the 2019 LPGA Tour and made four cuts. On the LET, she finished top-10 at the Fatima Bint Mubarak Ladies Open, Australian Ladies Classic and the Lalla Meryem Cup, ending the season 41st on the Order of Merit.

Professional wins (6)

Ladies European Tour wins (1)

Symetra Tour wins (1)

LET Access Series wins (2)

^Co-sanctioned with the Swedish Golf Tour

Swedish Golf Tour wins (3)

^Co-sanctioned with the LET Access Series

Team appearances
Amateur
European Ladies' Team Championship (representing Sweden): 2014, 2015

References

External links

Swedish female golfers
SMU Mustangs women's golfers
Ladies European Tour golfers
Sportspeople from Karlstad
1993 births
Living people
21st-century Swedish women